Faramarzi (Persian: فرامرزي) is a village in Iran. Faramarzi may also refer to
Aqa Baba-ye Faramarzi,  a village in Iran
Mazeh Faramarzi,  a village in Iran
Qaleh-ye Faramarzi,  a village in Iran
Abdolrahman Faramarzi, Iranian journalist, writer, educator, deputy of parliament and poet
Mohammad Ali Faramarzi, Iranian football defender

See also
Faramarz (disambiguation)